Farahiyeh (also Romanized as Farāhīyeh and Faraḩīyeh) is a village in Qaflankuh-e Gharbi Rural District, in the Central District of Meyaneh County, East Azerbaijan Province, Iran. At the 2006 census, its population was 77, in 15 families.

References 

Populated places in Meyaneh County